David Linus "Microchip" Lieberman (often known as Micro) is a fictional character appearing in American comic books published by Marvel Comics. He was an ally of The Punisher for many years and assisted the Punisher by building weapons, supplying technology, hacking into computers, and providing friendship. Microchip gradually evolved from the Punisher's friend to a bitter enemy after their final falling out.

Micro was portrayed by Wayne Knight in 2008's Punisher: War Zone and by Ebon Moss-Bachrach in the television adaption of the first season set in the Marvel Cinematic Universe.

Publication history
Microchip first appeared in The Punisher vol. 2 #4 (Nov. 1987) and was created by Mike Baron and Klaus Janson.

The character was inspired by Q from the James Bond series of novels and films.

Fictional character biography
David Linus "Microchip" Lieberman was a legendary computer hacker in the early days of the Internet, performing numerous scams and hacks still held in awe by his peers, until one scam brought him too close to real-world criminals and he was forced into "retirement", rebuilding his life as a quiet, unassuming businessman. This ended when his nephew, attempting to follow in his favorite uncle's footsteps, was caught and killed after accidentally hacking into the private computers of the Kingpin. While personally investigating his nephew's murder, Lieberman met and started collaborating with the Punisher. Microchip's help proved invaluable to Castle: he served not just as a hacker and cyber-investigator, but provided him with invaluable services, such as managing and laundering his finances (i.e., the money Castle takes from the criminals he kills), establishing and maintaining Castle's safehouses, helping Castle train in more "specialized" skills for his war on crime, and obtaining hard-to-get ammunition and equipment. Less obsessed with Castle's personal war, Microchip also acts as a de facto counselor to Castle (e.g., encouraging Castle to take occasional vacations and breaks, to avoid burn-out or losing his mind).

Over time, more of his past history is revealed. His father had been forced to create weapons against his will years before Micro was born; in the same issue he mentions his sister is a happy housewife in Ft. Lauderdale. Micro has an illegitimate son named Louis Frohike, who winds up getting killed while trying to assist the Punisher in a hostage exchange.

Micro is capable of fighting on his own such as when he took on an assassination ring threatening his godson's family. He also takes on less violent crime, such as when he discovered his new neighbor was being scammed by a "charity". He takes down the scammers from within, not by violence but by stealing incriminating records and sending them to fans of yodeling music so they can be publicized while keeping his involvement secret.

Outside of crime, some plots have revolved around Leiberman's weight. In one instance, he attempted to take a break and better control his health by enrolling in a rural camp for overweight people, which claimed to offer a revolutionary weight-loss drug to participants. However, he is once again drawn back into crime-fighting and seeking Castle's aid when he realizes the camp is a front for an amphetamines ring, and that the "weight-loss" drug was in fact intended to turn the camp's attendees into addicts.

One issue that dealt primarily with Micro was when Castle massacres a street gang running drugs, but a dealer named Jamal Jones survives. Micro warns Frank that Jones is hospitalized under heavy police protection and takes it upon himself to infiltrate the hospital through different disguises, first dressing as a telephone lineman and then a reporter under the pseudonym Linus Schultz (a likely reference to Charles M. Schulz and his famous character Linus van Pelt), so he could contact Jones with a message that the Punisher wants the name of his drug connection or he'll come back to finish the job. A slight insight to his wish to have a life outside of crime-fighting occurs when Micro thinks to himself about a brief meeting with a nurse and how even a casual encounter with a woman causes him to recognize that he spends "too much time with Frank and his 'war'".

Micro loses his left pinky finger when the Kingpin sends it to Castle after kidnapping his partner and threatening to use his knowledge of the Punisher's crimes to expose him. He is released from the Kingpin's custody when the Punisher agrees to kill one of the boss's rivals.

The Punisher's 1992 spin-off entitled The Punisher War Zone, written by Chuck Dixon and penciled by John Romita, Jr., provided further development for Micro. The first issues describe his growing disillusionment with the Punisher's crusade, with Micro going so far as to see a psychiatrist and take up acting in an attempt to deal with his frustration. After Castle discovers this, the two have a disagreement and Micro goes into hiding, working as a barman.

Micro develops a friendship with Mickey Fondozzi, a repentant Mafia soldier whom Frank recruits to his side. The two work on operations together, such as infiltrating the Secret Empire, a multi-faceted criminal organization. After the Punisher is seemingly killed in a failed ambush of an underworld meeting, the two find themselves literally on the street, their vehicle surrounded by police. When Micro refuses to help Mickey blast his way through the cops to escape, the latter abandons him.

Ultimately, Castle and Micro have one final fallout just before the cancellation of all three major Punisher titles in 1995. This fight comes to an end in the closing issues of The Punisher War Journal. Micro disagrees with Castle's increasingly violent methods, feeling that Castle has lost sight of their original goals and has gone too far for even him to tolerate. He decides to recruit a new "Punisher" to replace Castle, former Navy SEAL Carlos Cruz. Micro and Castle come face to face in one of Micro's safehouses in what appears to be a final confrontation. A gun battle ensues between the two former partners. This battle is interrupted by rogue S.H.I.E.L.D. agent Derek "Stone Cold" Smalls, who had been part of a program to take down vigilantes like Castle before becoming a vigilante himself. Smalls fires a rocket into the safe house, apparently killing Micro. Castle moves on, unsure if he would have really slain his old friend himself.

In the Civil War Files comic, just before the "Civil War" storyline was published, Iron Man talked about events in the Punisher's past from the Marvel Knights and MAX comics, which indicated that it did happen in the mainstream Marvel Universe at some point, meaning that Punisher killing Micro in the MAX series is also considered canonical to Earth-616.

During the 2008 - 09 "Dark Reign" storyline, Hood brings Microchip back from the dead and offers to bring his son back to life if he helps in dealing with the Punisher. Microchip sends Megatak to attack the Punisher's new hacker ally, Henry. To start off Hood's revival ritual of Castle's and Microchip's family, Microchip shoots G.W. Bridge in the head. Unfortunately, the Punisher refuses to help and threatens to use Firebrand to burn them alive. The death of Bridge succeeds in reanimating the corpses, but the Punisher, believing that his family is not actually present, forces Firebrand to destroy the bodies, then kills the villain.

In the Punisher: In the Blood mini-series, the Punisher returns to New York City and vows to find Micro and make him pay for murdering G.W. Bridge. Micro is shown being knocked unconscious by Jigsaw. While being held captive in Jigsaw's warehouse hideout, he is visited by Stuart Clarke, an old ally of the Punisher. Stuart explains that his girlfriend died at the Punisher's hand and that he swore to make him pay only to see his revenge failed. Stuart walks away warning Micro that the Punisher is coming. When the Punisher is captured, Jigsaw allows him to kill Micro by slashing his throat. Jigsaw's son Henry Russo learns his father was manipulating the Punisher and helps him to escape.

Other versions

Crossovers
Microchip accompanies the Punisher to Riverdale in Archie Meets the Punisher, and to Gotham City in Punisher and Batman; in the latter, he is narrowly bested by Robin in a "hacking duel".

Marvel MAX
In the Punisher: MAX universe, Microchip has been presumed dead for some time. However, he returns to attempt to pressure Castle into working for the CIA's black ops unit to participate in the hunt for terrorists. The Punisher declines, as he prefers his autonomy to indentured service to an institution such as the government. Microchip confesses to Castle that the source of funding for the operation came from the CIA funneling arms and heroin out of Afghanistan. Castle gives Micro a chance he has not given his victims since before he officially assumed the role of the Punisher: the chance to run. Microchip declines, obligated to help Castle in a CIA/Mafia firefight. Taking a possibly mortal injury in the fight, Micro attempts to humanize Castle again, only to be met with a point-blank shotgun round to the head.

Punisher Kills the Marvel Universe
Microchip, here a former member of the United States Air Force who was "kicked out" after Doctor Octopus ripped his legs off, is partnered with the Punisher by Kesselring, a superhuman-hating multi-millionaire who has convinced the Punisher to kill all the world's heroes and villains. Before going after his last target Daredevil, the Punisher tells Microchip "Last kill, Micro. You get some distance. Don't look back. You've got any sense, you'll find something else to do with that brain of yours. Something worth a damn." Microchip's response is a deadpan "Are you telling me to get a life?"

Space: Punisher
Microchip's equivalent is Chip, a robot the Punisher built to aid him in his vendetta against the Six-Fingered Hand. When the Punisher confronts a group of renegade Watchers, the true leaders of the Six-Fingered Hand, the entities destroy Chip. Though the Punisher is able to escape with his companion's severed head, the face of which he is revealed to have modeled after his murdered son's.

What If? Age of Ultron
The events of What If?: Age of Ultron caused one universe's Thor to drop dead while fighting the Midgard Serpent, which slaughtered the rest of that world's superpowered humans with the assistance of other Asgardian monsters. Microchip appears as a member of Nick Fury's Defenders, a group consisting of Earth's remaining non-powered heroes who are holed up in Latveria's Castle Doom. After filling a Quinjet with everything from the late Doctor Doom's armory, Microchip and the other Defenders, sans Fury and Black Widow, sacrifice themselves in a kamikaze attack against the Midgard Serpent, giving Black Widow the opportunity to acquire Mjolnir, become the new Thor, and kill the Serpent. Microchip and the others who died in this battle are later honored with individualized statues.

In other media

Television

 Microchip appears in Spider-Man, voiced by Robert Axelrod. This version goes by "Chip" and serves as the Punisher's conscience, urging him to use non-lethal weaponry.
 Microchip appears in the Marvel Cinematic Universe / Netflix series The Punisher, portrayed by Ebon Moss-Bachrach. This version is a former NSA analyst and family man.

Film
 Microchip was included in one of Michael France's early drafts for The Punisher. However, the character was excised from the final film at the insistence of director and co-writer Jonathan Hensleigh, who noted, "There are a couple of years where I didn't want to go; Microchip, the battle van, all that stuff where it got really high-tech; we're not going there at all. I deemed that too complicated, too lacking of the spirit of the sort of urban vigilante".
 Microchip appears in Punisher: War Zone, portrayed by Wayne Knight. After the Punisher accidentally kills undercover NYPD agent Nicky Donatelli, Jigsaw and "Loony Bin Jim" learn of Microchip, kill his mother, and kidnap him along with Nicky's wife Angela Donatelli and their daughter Grace to lure the Punisher into a trap. After the Punisher kills Jim, Jigsaw kills Microchip.

Video games
 Microchip provides mission briefings in The Punisher.
 Microchip appears on the Continue Screen of The Punisher, giving the Punisher CPR.
 Microchip appears in Spider-Man, voiced by Christopher Corey Smith.
 Microchip appears as a playable character in The Punisher: No Mercy.
 Microchip appears in Marvel: Avengers Alliance. This version serves as the driver of the Punisher's Battle Van.

References

External links
 Microchip at Marvel Fandom
 Microchip at Comic Vine
 

Characters created by Mike Baron
Comics characters introduced in 1987
Fictional characters from New York City
Fictional engineers
Fictional hackers
Fictional inventors
Fictional murdered people
Marvel Comics sidekicks
Punisher characters
Vigilante characters in comics